Cedar Lake is an unincorporated community in Cedar Lake Township, Scott County, Minnesota, United States, near New Prague and Elko New Market.  The community is located along Scott County Road 23 near 250th Street East.

References

Unincorporated communities in Minnesota
Unincorporated communities in Scott County, Minnesota